Francis Field may refer to:

Francis Field (Illinois), located at Greenville College
Francis Field (Missouri), located at Washington University in St. Louis
Francis J. Field (1895–1992), philatelist and stamp dealer

See also
Frank Field (disambiguation)